Lightning Strikes Twice is a 1951 Warner Bros-produced crime melodrama starring Ruth Roman and Richard Todd, and directed by King Vidor.

Plot
Once a wealthy rancher, young Richard Trevelyan (Richard Todd) is now on a Texas prison's death row. But he wins a new trial, which ends in a hung jury when a lone juror holds out.  He is set free.

Actress Shelley Carnes (Ruth Roman) is on her way to a Texas dude ranch for a rest. Along the way, she meets rich ranchers J.D. (Frank Conroy) and Myra Nolan (Kathryn Givney) and ends up being loaned their car. Lost in a storm, she encounters Trevelyan by chance. He becomes spooked when he learns she knows J.D. and Myra.

The dude ranch is closed when Shelley gets there. Liza McStringer (Mercedes McCambridge), who runs it with younger brother String (Darryl Hickman), explains that she was the juror who let Trevelyan off. Now she's being shunned by neighbors and friends.

Shelley bonds with the troubled String, so she is invited to stay a while. She learns that Loraine, the late wife of Trevelyan and murder victim, was a wicked woman, loathed by many. There is reason to believe Loraine once had an affair with J.D., Trevelyan's business partner through the ventures he inherited from his father.

Shelly goes looking for Trevelyan, and finds him brooding on a cliffside.  There are sparks, but no fire.  She leaves, troubled.

Returning the car, Shelley spends a night with the Nolans and is introduced to Harvey Turner (Zachary Scott), a woman-hungry neighbor who immediately makes a play for her.  He too speaks ill of Loraine, suggesting he was lucky to have escaped her clutches.

Later Harvey kidnaps Shelly, bringing her to a mysterious rendezvous with Trevelyan; it turns out the men are best friends, and Trevelyan had asked the favor.  This time the couple cannot resist each other, and hurriedly marry.  Liza appears, uninvited, at their intimate reception, accuses Trevelyan of being the murderer, and leaves in a state.  

That night, Shelley's fears get the best of her, and she flees back to the safety of the dude ranch. There, Liza confesses in a murderous rage that it was she, jealous and wanting Trevelyan for herself, who had killed Loraine after the tramp (who indeed had been involved with J.D. when his secretary) had bedded Harvey. She is stopped from strangling Shelley by Trevelyan and Harvey's arrival. Liza and String manage to flee in their car.

Pursued by police, she plunges the car over a cliff, but lives long enough to confess to a priest.  It turns out Trevelyan had been right all along: everybody did lie at his trial.  And he evidently had been telling the truth when he said he did not know how his wife had died.

Tevelyan gets a reassuring pat from the local sheriff.  The couple leave the scene in his car, Shelley kissing him repeatedly as they head together toward their honeymoon.

Cast
 Ruth Roman as Shelley Carnes
 Richard Todd as Richard Trevelyan
 Mercedes McCambridge as Liza McStringer
 Zachary Scott as Harvey Turner
 Frank Conroy as J. D. Nolan
 Kathryn Givney as Myra Nolan
 Rhys Williams as Father Paul
 Darryl Hickman as String
 Nacho Galindo as Pedro

Production
Warner Bros had owned the rights to the book since 1945.

Virginia Mayo was originally cast in the female lead.

The music score repeatedly echoes a passage from La valse by Maurice Ravel.

Reception

Box office
The film effectively broke even at the box office, having a budget of $1,108,000 and earning $1,144,000, $785,000 domestically and $359,000 internationally according to Warner Bros records.

Critical response
Film critic Glenn Erickson regarded the picture as high camp in his 2009 review:
As the 1950s rolled in director King Vidor's brilliant but eccentric pictures became much more eccentric than brilliant. The Fountainhead and Ruby Gentry break down into interesting patterns of dynamic visuals, even as their overheated dramatics are impossible to take seriously. 1951's Lightning Strikes Twice forms a link between King Vidor and Douglas Sirk's delirious women's pictures. Faced with a gimmicky, far-fetched storyline and inconsistent characters, Vidor still manages to make the movie highly watchable, even enjoyable ... But get ready to smile at the overcooked, sometimes hysterical acting and the big fuss made over a fairly simple mystery ... the picture is a camp hoot from one end to the other.

Vidor retrospective screening
In February 2020, the film was shown at the 70th Berlin International Film Festival, as part of a retrospective dedicated to King Vidor's career.

Shown on the Turner Classic Movies show 'Noir Alley' with Eddie Muller on February 18, 2023.

References

External links
 
 
 
 
 Lightning Strikes Twice information site and DVD review at DVD Beaver (includes images) 
 

1951 films
1950s crime films
American black-and-white films
American crime films
1950s English-language films
Film noir
Films scored by Max Steiner
Films based on American novels
Films set in Texas
Warner Bros. films
Films directed by King Vidor
1951 drama films
1950s American films